Heavy Mood is the fourth studio album by American indie pop group Tilly and the Wall. It was released in October 2012 under Team Love Records, and produced by Mike Mogis.

Track listing

References

2012 albums
Tilly and the Wall albums
Team Love Records albums